Therapy at 3 is the first collaborative studio album by Eligh and Amp Live. It was released by Legendary Music and Live Up in 2011. It peaked at number 33 on the Billboard Heatseekers Albums chart.

Track listing

Charts

References

External links
 
 

2011 albums
Collaborative albums
Alternative hip hop albums by American artists
Eligh albums